"Cheeseburger in Paradise" is a song written and performed by American popular music singer Jimmy Buffett. It appeared on his 1978 album Son of a Son of a Sailor and was released as a single, reaching No. 32 on the Billboard Hot 100.  "Cheeseburger in Paradise" has become one of Buffett's signature songs and was selected as the first track on his greatest hits album Songs You Know by Heart.

Content
The song is about a man who "is trying to amend his carnivorous habits" with health food such as sunflower seeds, but it was inspired by an experience that actually happened to Buffett: he had been forced to eat only canned food and peanut butter due to a boating mishap in the Caribbean, but eventually made it to landfall and managed to order the song's titular dish in paradise ("Roadtown on the island of Tortola"). However, other burger restaurants in the Caribbean have claimed to be the inspiration for the song as well.

Reception
Cash Box praised the bass line and vocals.  Record World said that it "rocks with a hint of country, and has a hand-clapping segment that is especially appealing" and that it makes for "most amusing listening."

Chart performance

Diner

In 2002, Buffett's company Margaritaville Holdings LLC licensed the name of the song to OSI Restaurant Partners as the name of the Buffett-themed Cheeseburger in Paradise restaurant chain.  In 2006, the restaurant had 38 locations in 17 states in the United States and one in Sydney, Australia. By 2018 only a single restaurant in Secaucus, New Jersey remained of the chain.

A Cheeseburger in Paradise is a menu item at Buffett-owned Margaritaville Cafes located in the United States, Mexico, Canada, and the Caribbean, as well as being on the menu at his sister Lucy's restaurant "Lulu's" in Gulf Shores, Alabama.

Misheard lyrics
According to the lyrics found on the vinyl sleeve, Buffett sings "cheeseburger is Paradise" twice throughout the song.  It is unclear whether he is actually saying in or is, but "cheeseburger is Paradise" can clearly be heard during live performances. Whether this is a fact for the studio version hasn't been confirmed.

Also, another lyrical confusion is in the second chorus, during the line "medium rare with Muenster'd be nice"; the line is commonly mistaken as saying mustard instead of Muenster.

Tour
1978 saw Buffett begin his own tour with the Coral Reefer Band, spending March and April playing along the east coast and then the mid-west. June brought California dates which included a few shows opening for Jackson Browne in San Jose and Angels Camp, California. August brought a Florida stadium tour with the Little River Band and the Steve Miller Band along with three shows in Atlanta and Miami which were recorded for the live album You Had To Be There

1978 Coral Reefer Band
Jimmy Buffett: Vocals and guitar
Barry Chance: Guitar
Harry Dailey: Bass and background Vocals
Deborah McColl: Background vocals
Greg "Fingers" Taylor – Harmonica and background Vocals
Jay Spell – Piano
Michael Utley – Organ
Kenneth Buttrey – Drums

Performance
The set list changed nightly, mainly with an acoustic set between "Margaritaville" and "Why Don't We Get Drunk"—however, You Had to Be There chronicles some unusual inclusions, such as: "Miss You So Badly" replaces "Mañana"; a new song "Perrier Blues" emerges later in the tour; a rare performance of "The Captain and the Kid" appeared during the acoustic set; and "Cheeseburger in Paradise" was missing.  The shows opened with "Son of a Son of a Sailor" and closed with "Tampico Trauma" every night; and the encore typically consisted of "Morris' Nightmare", "Dixie Diner" (Larry Raspberry and the Highsteppers cover) and "Last Line" (Keith Sykes cover) respectively, with "Morris' Nightmare" closing the show only when it debuted in Boston.

Setlist
An average set list:

"Son of a Son of a Sailor"
"Pencil Thin Mustache"
"Wonder Why We Ever Go Home"
"Landfall"
"Mañana"
"Livingston Saturday Night"
"Margaritaville"
"Grapefruit—Juicy Fruit" (acoustic)
"Banana Republics" (Steve Goodman cover) (acoustic)
"He Went to Paris" (acoustic)
"God's Own Drunk" (Richard Buckley cover) (acoustic)
"Why Don't We Get Drunk" (mostly performed with the Coral Reefer Band, but occasionally performed acoustically)
"Coast of Marseilles" (Keith Sykes cover)
"Cheeseburger in Paradise"
"Changes in Latitudes, Changes in Attitudes"
"A Pirate Looks at Forty"
"Come Monday"
"Tampico Trauma"  Encore:
"Morris' Nightmare"
"Dixie Diner" (Larry Raspberry And The Highsteppers cover)  Encore 2:
"The Last Line" (Keith Skyes cover)

References

1978 singles
Jimmy Buffett songs
Songs written by Jimmy Buffett
ABC Records singles
1978 songs
Hamburgers (food)